The European Council of Skeptical Organisations (ECSO) is an umbrella of skeptical organisations in Europe.

Goals 
Founded on 25 September 1994, the ECSO aims to co-ordinate activities of European organisations and individuals that aim at critically investigating pseudoscientific statements and claims regarding observations of paranormal phenomena, and to make the results of its investigations known to the broad public. It means to continue the series of European skeptical congresses that preceded its foundation and supports a biennial congress and a symposium every other year.

The Charter of the European Council of Skeptical Organisations states that it strives
1) To protect the public from the promulgation of claims and therapies which have not been subjected to critical testing and thus might pose a danger to them.
2) To investigate by means of controlled tests and experiments such extraordinary claims which are on the fringe of or contradict current scientific knowledge. In particular this applies to phenomena commonly identified as "paranormal" or "pseudoscientific". However no claims, explanations or theories will be rejected in advance of objective evaluation.
3) To promote public policy based on good practice in science and medicine.
The Charter was signed by Amardeo Sarma (GWUP), Michael Howgate (UK Skeptics), Miguel Angel Sabadell (ARP), Paul Kurtz (CSICOP), Tim Trachet (SKEPP), Arlette Fougnies (Comité Para) and Cornelis de Jager (Stichting Skepsis).

Structure

Board of directors 

Cornelis de Jager served as first president until 2001, when he was replaced by Amardeo Sarma (2001–2013), who in turn was succeeded by Gábor Hraskó (2013–2017). Since 2017 the president has been Claire Klingenberg. As of September 2019, the ECSO board is composed as follows:
 Claire Klingenberg (Sisyfos)President
 Tim Trachet (SKEPP)Vice-President
 Catherine de Jong (VtdK)Vice-President
 Amardeo Sarma (GWUP)Treasurer
 Paola De Gobbi (CICAP)Member
 Pontus Böckman (VoF)Member
 Michael Heap (ASKE)Member
 András Gábor Pintér (SzT)Member
 Jean-Paul Krivine (AFIS)Member

Member organisations 
The ECSO brings together the following skeptic groups:

Furthermore, the Committee for Skeptical Inquiry (CSI, formerly CSICOP), whose founder and long-time chairman Paul Kurtz was actively involved its formation (especially because the Skeptical Inquirer had many subscribers in Europe), and the Israel Skeptics Society are associate members of the ECSO.

European Skeptics Congress 

European Skeptics Congresses (ESCs), in which skeptical organisations from many different European countries participate, have been held ever since 1989. The conferences are often held in the month of September, and may last from two up to four days. The ECSO was formed at the 6th ESC on 25 September 1994 in Ostend, Belgium. Since its foundation, the ECSO co-ordinates in the organisation of new ESCs that take place (on average) every other year, and is hosted by a different member organisation each time. Skeptical organisations that are non-ECSO members may also send their delegations. Past ESCs have been:

Other 
Gábor Hraskó, who was then President of ECSO, stated in a 2015 interview that some goals of ECSO are to facilitate communication between the member groups; organise the regular conferences, and keep track of the active leaders for the various European groups. Sometimes a leader or a whole group will "disappear", and some groups are still active but with new leaders; it is important to "establish networks". At the 2015 conference held in London, Hraskó felt that he had learned a lot about organising from the UK skeptic groups. They operate differently than the continental Europeans, which tend to be one group that runs everything. The UK groups are all independent and more grassroots, but they end up working together on big conferences and projects. The 2017 conference "hopefully will be with the Polish and Czech skeptics".  Hraskó stated that the Czech skeptics disappeared for some time, and he hopes that they have re-organised and they and the Polish skeptics will formalize the plans for the 2017 conference. This was achieved with the Polish Skeptics’ Club in cooperation with the Czech Skeptics’ Club Sisyfos organising the 17th biannual European Skeptics Congress 2017 in Wrocław, Poland. They were denied access to their initial venue on religious grounds, then they changed venue to the Faculty of Law, Administration and Economics at the University of Wrocław. The ECSO met at the end of the conference and new leadership was elected. Claire Klingenberg took over as president from Gábor Hraskó. In an interview with Eran Segev for the Skeptic Zone podcast, Klingenberg said that the conference “went great … quite productive and stimulating.” When Segev congratulated her on her new role as president of ECSO, he asked her what her top priority for ESCO was. Her answer was, “make ECSO important … it has to be more relevant, more influential … and seen as a partner not just with European skeptics, but with organizations all over the world.”

Catherine de Jong stated that having an organization overseeing the entire European skeptic groups is helpful to disseminate information when an alt med lecturer is planning a European tour. She gave the example of faith healer Peter Popoff being one who planned a tour of Europe. The UK skeptic Michael Marshall was able to contact the ECSO, who in turn were able to notify all the leaders of the other groups. They were able to share information and plan how to handle the events.

András Gabor Pinter reported from the 2019 conference in Belgium that they heard presentations about investigating psychics, the anti-vaccination movement, GMOs, and nuclear power. "Energy policies should be driven by science and as skeptics that’s what we advocate, after all."

Awards 
During the 6th World Skeptics Congress (Berlin, 18–20 May 2012), co-sponsored by the ECSO, GWUP and the Committee for Skeptical Inquiry (CSI), the ECSO presented the "Outstanding Skeptics Award" to Wim Betz (SKEPP) and Luigi Garlaschelli (CICAP) "in recognition of [their] dedication and outstanding contributions in promoting science and investigating extraordinary claims". Simultaneously, the CSI presented Simon Singh and Edzard Ernst with the "In Praise of Reason Award" "in recognition of [their] distinguished contribution to the use of critical inquiry, scientific evidence, and reason in evaluating claims to knowledge".

See also 
 European Humanist Federation
 List of skeptical conferences
 List of skeptical organizations
 QED: Question, Explore, Discover
 The Amaz!ng Meeting (TAM!)

References

External links 

 

International organisations based in Germany
Scientific skepticism
Skeptic organisations in Germany
International organizations based in Europe
1994 establishments in Europe
Organizations established in 1994